Reynaldo Jacinto Publico Jr. (born November 29, 1992) is a Filipino basketball player for the Blackwater Bossing of the Philippine Basketball Association (PBA). He was drafted 4th in the 2nd round of the 2019 PBA draft.

Professional career
Publico was drafted by the Alaska Aces in the 2nd round (4th) of the 2019 PBA draft.

On May 23, 2022, he signed one-year deal with the Blackwater Bossing.

PBA career statistics

As of the end of 2022–23 season

Season-by-season averages

|-
| align=left | 
| align=left | Alaska
| 7 || 6.2 || .250 || .200 || .750 || 1.0 || .0 || .0 || .0 || 1.4
|-
| align=left | 
| align=left | Alaska
| 7 || 4.5 || .100 || .000 || 1.000 || .7 || .1 || .0 || .0 || .6
|-
| align=left | 
| align=left | Blackwater
| 12 || 8.4 || .357 || .220 || .750 || 1.4 || .3 || .1 || .2 || 2.3
|-class=sortbottom
| align="center" colspan=2 | Career
| 26 || 6.8 || .280 || .150 || .786 || 1.1 || .2 || .0 || .1 || 1.6

References 

1992 births
Living people
Alaska Aces (PBA) players
Basketball players from Batangas
Filipino men's basketball players
Letran Knights basketball players
Maharlika Pilipinas Basketball League players
People from Batangas City
Power forwards (basketball)
Alaska Aces (PBA) draft picks